Wicksteed may refer to:

People
Alexander Wicksteed, English traveller and writer
Charles Wicksteed (1810–1885), Unitarian minister, part of the tradition of English Dissenters
Charles Wicksteed (1847–1931), British engineer, businessman, and entrepreneur
Connie Wicksteed or Habeas Corpus (play), stage comedy in two acts by the English author Alan Bennett
Philip Wicksteed (1844–1927), known primarily as an economist
Thomas Wicksteed (1806–1871), notable English civil engineer of the 19th century

Associated with Kettering
Wicksteed Park, amusement park in Kettering, Northamptonshire, England
St. Michael's & Wicksteed (Kettering BC Ward), a ward of Kettering Borough Council, created by boundary changes in 2007
Wicksteed (Kettering BC Ward), two-member ward within Kettering Borough Council

See also
Wicked (disambiguation)
Wickstead, a surname